Pintados (International title: The Painted Ones) is a Philippine television drama action series broadcast by GMA Network. Directed by Mark Reyes, it stars Angelika dela Cruz, Michael Flores, Assunta de Rossi, Vandolph Quizon and Sherwin Ordonez. It premiered on September 4, 1999. The series concluded on September 2, 2000 with a total of 52 episodes.

Cast and characters
Lead cast
 Michael Flores as Daniel Cervantes / Datu
 Angelika dela Cruz as Reewa Zulueta / Diwata
 Vandolph as Antonio Sto. Domingo / Tattoo
 Assunta de Rossi as Maya Feliciano / Mayumi
 Sherwin Ordoñez as Pido Zapata / Kidlat

Supporting cast
 Lindsay Custodio as Caline Mendoza
 Ryan Eigenmann as Katana
 Robert Seña as Guro
 Ace Espinosa as Raja
 Jaime Fabregas as Anak Araw
Rustom Padilla Dr. Virus
 Michael V. as Uno Dos Tres
 Samantha Lopez as Thundara
 Manny Castañeda as Madam Odorifica
 Smokey Manaloto as Mad Bomber
  Mel Martinez as Damarama
 KC Montero as KC / Kaptain Crusader
 Michael Lukban as Himself
 Kirby Ramos as Matthew
 Monsour Del Rosario as Sung Long

References

External links
 

1999 Philippine television series debuts
2000 Philippine television series endings
Filipino-language television shows
GMA Network drama series
Philippine action television series
Television shows set in the Philippines